Remigijus Lupeikis (born 22 September 1968) is a Lithuanian former track and road racing cyclist. Initially competing for the Soviet Union prior to its breakup, he had a long career riding for Lithuania, which included competing in both road and track events at the 1996 Summer Olympics, and in the road race at the 2000 Summer Olympics.

Born in Klaipėda, Lupeikis was never selected to race in the Tour de France, but he did compete at the Vuelta a España in 1992 and 1997 as well as the Giro d'Italia in 1992. He won the Tour de Berlin in 1994. In 1995 he won a silver medal in the Men's points race at the 1995 UCI Track Cycling World Championships in Colombia. He won Lithuanian Sportsman of the Year that same year. He won the Tour d'Egypte in 2000. Also in 2000, he was Lithuanian champion in the individual time trial. He retired from cycling in 2002, after becoming Lithuanian champion in the road race.

Major results

1991
 1st Stage 1 Clásico RCN
 1st Stage 4 Vuelta a Colombia
1992
 Tour du Poitou-Charentes
1st Stages 4 & 5
 10th Overall Vuelta a Murcia
1993
 Tour de Pologne
1st Prologue & Stages 1, 2 & 8
 2nd Overall Mi-Août en Bretagne
1994
 1st Tour de Berlin
 2nd Overall Ronde van Midden-Nederland
 3rd Overall Teleflex Tour
1st Stage 4
1995
 1st Stage 2 Volta ao Algarve
2000
 1st Overall Tour d'Egypte
1st Stages 2 & 7
 2nd Road race, National Road Championships
 2nd Overall Course de la Solidarité Olympique
1st Stage 4
2001
 1st Stage 7 Tour of Slovenia
 3rd Overall Szlakiem Grodów Piastowskich
 3rd Overall Herald Sun Tour
1st Stage 12 (TTT)
2002
 National Road Championships
1st  Road race
2nd Time trial
 1st Stage 8 Peace Race
 1st Stage 4 Tour de Pologne
 2nd Overall Szlakiem Grodów Piastowskich
 6th GP Herning

Grand Tour general classification results timeline

References

External links

1968 births
Cyclists at the 1996 Summer Olympics
Cyclists at the 2000 Summer Olympics
Lithuanian male cyclists
Olympic cyclists of Lithuania
Sportspeople from Klaipėda
Road racing cyclists
Lithuanian track cyclists
Living people
Lithuanian Sportsperson of the Year winners